Nykyforove is an urban-type settlement in the Snizhne urban hromada, Horlivka Raion, Donetsk Oblast (province) of eastern Ukraine. Population:

Demographics
According to the 2001 Ukrainian census, the village had a population of 408 residents.

The majority of the population in Nykyforove speaks Russian as their first language, with 87.99% of residents stating it as their mother tongue. A smaller proportion of the population, 12.01%, identified Ukrainian as their mother tongue.

References

Urban-type settlements in Horlivka Raion
Horlivka Raion